National Highway 3 or National Road No.3 (10003) is one of the national highways of Cambodia. The road underwent significant refurbishment in 2008 and forms part of an international "North-South economic corridor" from Kunming in China to Bangkok in Thailand.

References

Roads in Cambodia